Emil Ghuri (alternatively spelled Emil Ghoury) (1907–1984), a Palestinian Christian who was Secretary-General of the Arab Higher Committee (AHC), the official leadership of the Arabs in British Mandate of Palestine. He was also the Secretary-general of the Palestine Arab Party.

In May 1947 Ghuri was nominated by the AHC as a member of its delegation to represent it before the United Nations in its special session for Palestine. Other people nominated for this delegation were Jamal al-Husayni, Henry Cattan, Wasef Kamal, Issa Nakhleh, Rasem Khalidi.

See also
Palestinian Christians

References

External links
Profile of Emil Ghuri, PASSIA
Biography of Emil Ghuri 

Palestine Arab Party politicians
1907 births
1984 deaths
Palestinian Arab nationalists
Palestinian nationalists
Mandatory Palestine people of World War II